Berasia tehsil is a tehsil in bhopal district, Madhya Pradesh, India. It is also a subdivision of the administrative and revenue division of bhopal district of Madhya Pradesh. Assembly constituency is Berasia.

Demographics

References 

Tehsils of Madhya Pradesh
Bhopal district